The Smithfield Public Library, at 25 N. Main St. in Smithfield, Utah, is a Carnegie library which was built in 1921.  It was listed on the National Register of Historic Places in 1981.

It was designed by architect Fred W. Hodgson in Prairie School style.

References

Carnegie libraries in Utah
National Register of Historic Places in Cache County, Utah
Prairie School architecture
Buildings and structures completed in 1921